Konotopsky Uyezd was one of the subdivisions of the Chernigov Governorate of the Russian Empire. It was situated in the southeastern part of the governorate. Its administrative centre was Konotop.

Demographics
At the time of the Russian Empire Census of 1897, Konotopsky Uyezd had a population of 156,535. Of these, 90.9% spoke Ukrainian, 4.9% Yiddish, 3.4% Russian, 0.3% Belarusian, 0.3% Polish, 0.1% German and 0.1% Romani as their native language.

References

 
Uyezds of Chernigov Governorate
Chernigov Governorate